Hasanabad-e Mehrab Jan (also Romanized as Ḩasanābād-e Mehrāb Jān; also known as Ḩasanābād and Ḩasanābād-e Mehrāb Khān) is a village in Zeydabad Rural District, in the Central District of Sirjan County, Kerman Province, Iran. At the 2006 census, its population was 44, in 10 families.

References 

Populated places in Sirjan County